Otocinclus mangaba is a species of catfish in the family Loricariidae. It is a tropical freshwater species native to South America, where it occurs in the Madeira River drainage. The species reaches 2.8 cm (1.1 inches) SL. The specific epithet of this fish derives from mangaba, the Portuguese name for the fruit of the plant Hancornia speciosa, which Humaitá, a municipality near where the species is found, is known for.

References 

Hypoptopomatini
Fish described in 2010
Fauna of South America